The 2014–15 season of the Serie A is the 30th season of top-tier futsal in Italy, which began September 27, 2014 and will finish on April 18, 2015. At the end of the regular season the top eight teams will play in the championship playoffs. The quarter and semi-finals will be a best of three series and the final will be a best of five-game series. The bottom two clubs will play in a two-leg playoff (home and away) to see who is relegated to Serie A2.

2014-15 Season teams

Regular season table

Fixture table

Relegation playoff

1st leg

2nd leg

Fabrizio wins 8–5 on aggregate and remains in Serie A. Sestu is relegated to Serie A2.

Championship playoffs

Calendar

Bracket

Quarter-finals

1st leg

2nd leg

3rd Leg

Semifinals

1st leg

2nd leg

3rd leg

Final

1st leg

2nd leg

3rd leg

4th leg

See also
Coppa Italia 2014-15 (futsal)

References

External links 
 Divisione calcio a 5

Serie A (futsal) seasons
Italy
Futsal